The Ely Shoshone Indian Reservation is an Indian reservation for the Ely Shoshone Tribe of Nevada, Shoshone people, in and near the south side of the city of Ely in south-central White Pine County, Nevada. In 2005 it had a population of around 500, a textile business, and its own court system. The reservation is quite small, with a land area of only 104.99 acres (0.4249 km²) and a 2000 census official resident population of 133 persons. Part of the city of Ely lies within its territory.

References

External links
www.greatbasinheritage.org/elyshoshone.htm Ely Shoshone

Western Shoshone
American Indian reservations in Nevada
Federally recognized tribes in the United States
Geography of White Pine County, Nevada